<< List of Vanity Fair caricatures (1895-1899) >> List of Vanity Fair caricatures (1905-1909)

Next List of Vanity Fair (British magazine) caricatures (1905-1909)

 
1900s in the United Kingdom